Neftalí Álvarez Núñez, known professionally as Pacho Al-Qaeda and Pacho El Antifeka, is a Puerto Rican musician.

Career 
He was part of the duo Pacho y Cirilo. In 2018, he recorded "Como Soy" under the name Pacho Al-Qaeda with Daddy Yankee and Bad Bunny.

In March 2021, Pancho El Antifeka collaborated with Wisin & Yandel and Jay Wheeler on the single "No Te Veo Remix." In 2021, he performed with Ovi and El Taiger.

His discography includes singles "Olvídate de Él" with Alex Rose, "Triste" with Nicky Jam, and "Qué Ser?" with Nio Garcia and Casper Magico.

In October 2021, he released his first single, "All Star Game," with Lunay under the label Duars Entertainment. The music video was filmed in Miami and directed by Gus Camacho.

Personal life 
In 2015, Álvarez Núñez resided in Juana Matos, Cataño, Puerto Rico. In March 2015, he pleaded guilty to a two-count federal indictment charging him with possession of a firearm and ammunition by an unlawful user of a controlled substance and possession of a machine gun. He was sentenced in August 2015.

References

Living people
Year of birth missing (living people)
Place of birth missing (living people)
People from Cataño, Puerto Rico
Puerto Rican reggaeton musicians
21st-century Puerto Rican male singers
American people convicted of drug offenses
Puerto Rican criminals
21st-century American criminals
American male criminals